Eyewitness or eye witness may refer to:

Witness
 Witness, someone who has knowledge acquired through first-hand experience
 Eyewitness memory
 Eyewitness testimony

Arts, entertainment, and media

Films
 Eyewitness (1956 film), a British film starring Donald Sinden
 Eyewitness (1970 film), a film starring Mark Lester
 Eyewitness (1981 film), a thriller starring William Hurt, Sigourney Weaver and Christopher Plummer
 Eyewitness (1999 film), nominated for an Academy Award for Best Short Documentary

Music
 Eyewitness (Royal Hunt album)
 Eyewitness (Kayak album)

Television
 Eye Witness (TV series), 1953 American anthology television series
 Eyewitness (UK TV series), British natural history television series
 Eyewitness (U.S. TV series), 2016 American drama television series, based on Øyevitne
 Øyevitne (Eyewitness), 2014 Norwegian drama series

Other arts, entertainment, and media
 Eyewitness a book by Ernest Dunlop Swinton
 Eyewitness Books
 The Eye-Witness, a magazine published by G. K. Chesterton